The 1980 Midwestern City Conference men's basketball tournament (now known as the Horizon League men's basketball tournament) was held February 29 – March 2 at Roberts Municipal Stadium in Evansville, Indiana. This was the first edition of the tournament.

 topped  in the inaugural championship game, 103–93, to win their first MCC/Horizon League men's basketball tournament.

The Golden Eagles, however, did not receive a bid to the 1980 NCAA tournament.

Format
All six conference members participated in the tournament and were seeded based on regular season conference records. The top two teams were given byes into the semifinal round while the remaining four teams were placed into the initial quarterfinal round.

Bracket

References

Horizon League men's basketball tournament
Tournament
Midwestern City Conference men's basketball tournament
Midwestern City Conference men's basketball tournament
Midwestern City Conference men's basketball tournament